Liebknecht is the surname:
Karl Liebknecht (1871–1919), German socialist
Sophie Liebknecht (1884–1964), Russian-born German socialist, second wife of Karl Liebknecht
Theodor Liebknecht (1870–1948), 
Werner Liebknecht (1905–?) German engineer
Wilhelm Liebknecht (1826–1900), German Social Democrat, father of Karl Liebknecht